Karen Ann Marsh (married name Hadlee; born 26 December 1951) is a New Zealand former cricketer who played as a right-handed batter and right-arm fast-medium bowler. She played a single match for New Zealand, at the 1978 World Cup. She played domestic cricket for Canterbury.

Marsh was born in Whangārei, in New Zealand's North Island. A pace-bowling all-rounder, her sole One Day International (ODI) appearance for New Zealand came at the 1978 World Cup in India, against England. Coming in sixth in the batting order, she scored 14 runs from 17 balls, but was not called upon to bowl. Marsh was married to Richard Hadlee, who also played international cricket for New Zealand (both at Test and ODI level). The pair had two sons together, but later divorced.

References

External links 

1951 births
Living people
Cricketers from Whangārei
New Zealand women cricketers
New Zealand women One Day International cricketers
Canterbury Magicians cricketers
Hadlee family